Before the introduction of the Metric system, one may divide the history of Indian systems of measurement into three main periods: the pre-Akbar's period, the period of the Akbar system, and the British colonial period.

During pre-Akbar period, weights and measure system varied from region to region, commodity to commodity, and rural to urban areas. The weights were based on the weight of various seeds (specially the wheat berry and Ratti) and lengths were based on the length of arms and width of fingers. Akbar realized a need for a uniform system. He elected the barley corn. This did not replace the existing system.  Instead, it just added another system.

British entered India as traders. They accepted barley corn as a unit 'grain' for weighing gold. Eventually, British introduced their own system for weighing gold (Troy ounce). In 1956, Government of India passed the Standards of Weights Act, that came into effect in 1958.The metric weight mandatory by October 1960, and the metric measures mandatory by April 1962.

Conversion 

In 1956, for metrication, the Indian government defined the Standards of Measurements Act (No. 89 of 1956, amended 1960, 1964) as follows:

The current definitions as per the UN are:

Ancient system

These are the weights and measures popular in North India before the adoption of the metric system. There were different systems in Bengal, the Presidency of Madras, and Bombay. The following nomenclature was prevalent in North India till the metric system came in:-

4 Chawal (grain of rice) = 1 Dhan (weight of one wheat berry)

4 Dhan = 1 Ratti (Ratti is the seed of the 'Abrus precatorius'. It is a red seed with a black spot at one end. Abul Fazl refers to it as 'Surkh' in Ain-i-Akbari.).

8 Ratti = 1 Masha

12 Masha (96 Ratti) = 1 bhari

24 Ratti (96 Dhan) = 1 Tak

Conversion

1 Bhari = 11.66375 gram

3.75 Troy ounce = 10 bhari

Weight of 64 Dhan (Wheat berries) = Weight of 45 Jau (Barley corns)

Weight of 1 Barley corn = 64.79891 milligrams

Commodity Weight System

1 bhari = 4 Siki

1 Kancha = 5 Siki

1 Chhataank = 4 Kancha

1 Chhataank = 5 bhari

1 Adh-pav = 2 Chhatank = 1/8 Seer

1 Pav = 2 Adh-pav = ¼ Seer (Pav means ¼)

1 Adher = 2 Pav = ½ Seer

In Hindi ½ Seer = Adha (½) Seer, or Adher

1 Ser = 2 Adher = 4 Pav = 16 Chattank = 80 Tola = 933.1 grams

1 Savaser = 1 Ser + 1 Pav (1¼ Seer)

1 Savaser weighed 100 Imperial rupees

In Hindi 1¼ Seer = Sava (1¼) Seer, or Savaser

1 Dhaser = 2 Savaser = 2½ Seer

In Hindi 2½ Seer = Dhai (2½) Seer, or Dhaser

1 Paseri = 2 Adisari = 5 Seer

In Hindi 5 Seer = Panch (5) Seer, or Paseri for short

1 Daseri = 2 Pasri = 10 Seer

In Hindi 10 Seer = Das (10) Seer, or Daseri for short

1 Maund (maan or man[मण]) = 4 Daseri = 8 Pasri = 40 Seer

 
Rice and Grains Volume Measures

Grains were not weighed. Special hour-glass shaped measure were used to determine the volume.

Smallest unit = 1 Nilve

2 Nilve = 1 Kolve

2 Kolve = 1 Chipte (about quarter litre)

2 Chipte = 1 Mapte (about half litre)

2 Mapte = 1 Ser (about one litre)

 
Liquid Volume Measures

These were hour glass shaped measure used for Milk, Ghee, Oils. The bottom was round like an inverted dome, the top was like flared rim. This shape helped in pouring the liquids.

4 Chhataank = 1 Pav

4 Pav = 1 Seer

40 Seer = 1 Maund

Length Measure

Measure of length is Gaz. To interpret Gaz, depends on what one is measuring and where they are. Bengal: 36", Bombay: 27", Madras: 33", Government Average: 33". The hand measurements were used.
 
Anguli (width of 3 fingers) = 1 Girah

8 Girah = 1 Hath (elbow to the end of the middle finger, approximately 18" )

5 5/6 Hath = One Kathi

20 Kathi = One Pand

1 Pand= 1 Beesa

20 Pand = One Begah

2 Hath = 1 Gaz

3 Gaz = Two Karam

3 Karams = 1 Kan

3 Square Kans = 1 Marla

20 Marlas = 1 Kanal

8 Kanals = 1 Ghamaon

9 Kanals 12 Marlas = 1 Acre

4 Kanals = 1 Begah

Medieval system

Akbar weights and measures

Akbar standardised weights and measurements using a barley corn (Jau). For weights, he used the weight of a Jau, while the width of a Jau set the standard for length.

1. Length: Ilahi Gaz; 1 Gaz = 16 Grehs; 1 Greh = 2 pais

At the time of Shah Jahan there existed three different Gaz:

a) Shahi gaz = 101.6 cm
b) Shahijahani or Lashkari = 95.85 cm
c) Aleppo gaz = 67.73 cm

2. Commodity weight: Ser = 637.74 grams

3. Commodity Spices: The Dam was a copper coin used as a weight as well as currency. 1 Dam = 20 grams

4. Gold and Expensive Spices: Misqal = 6.22 grams

Weights before 1833

8 rattīs = 1 māshā (= 0.907(2) gram)

12 māshās = 1 tolā (= 10.886227 gram)

80 tolas = 1 ser  (= 870.89816 gram)

40 sers = 1 maund (= 34 kg 8 hectograms 3 dekagrams 5g 9 decigrams 2.6 centigrams/34.835926 kilograms)

1 rattī = 1.75 grains  (= 0.11339825 gram/113 milligrams 398250 nanograms 4 attograms  )  (1 grain = 0.064799 gram)

From 1833 the rupee and tolā weight was fixed at 180 grains, i.e. 11.66382 grams. Hence the weight of 1 maund increased to 37.324224 kilogram.
Traditionally one maund represented the weight unit for goods which could be carried over some distance by porters or pack animals.

British system

References
1 coss= 2000 yards
Notes

Sources
 Prinsep, James (editor Edward Thomas): Essays on Indian Antqities, Historic, Numismatic, and Palaeographic, of the late James Prinsep, F.R.S., to which are added his Useful Tables illustrative of Indian History, Chronology, Modern Coinages, Weights, Measures etc. Two Volumes, Reprint, Indological Book House, Delhi and Varanasi, 1971. Originally published in London, 1858.

External links 

 http://www.indiacurry.com/Miscel/indiahistoricweightsmeasure.htm   **Not accessible 14/11/2022

Customary units in India
Economy of India